Tendil may refer to:

 Tendil (cycling team), a cycling team that took part of the Milano–Torino  cycling race
 Alexis Tendil (1896–2005), one of the last surviving French veterans of the First World War

See also
 Tendilla, a municipality in Guadalajara, Castile-La Mancha, Spain